The United Kingdom participated in the Eurovision Song Contest 2001 with the song "No Dream Impossible" written by Russ Ballard and Chris Winter. The song was performed by Lindsay Dracass. The British entry for the 2001 contest in Copenhagen, Denmark, was selected via the national final A Song for Europe 2001, organised by the British broadcaster BBC. Eight acts competed in the national final which consisted of a semi-final and a final, during which the winner was selected entirely through a public televote.

In the final of the Eurovision Song Contest, the United Kingdom performed in position 16 and placed 15th out of the 23 participating countries with 28 points.

Background

Prior to the 2001 contest, the United Kingdom has participated in the Eurovision Song Contest forty-three times. Thus far, the United Kingdom has won the contest five times: in 1967 with the song "Puppet on a String" performed by Sandie Shaw, in 1969 with the song "Boom Bang-a-Bang" performed by Lulu, in 1976 with the song "Save Your Kisses for Me" performed by Brotherhood of Man, in 1981 with the song "Making Your Mind Up" performed by Bucks Fizz and in 1997 with the song "Love Shine a Light" performed by Katrina and the Waves. To this point, the nation is noted for having finished as the runner-up in a record fifteen contests. Up to and including 1998, the UK had only twice finished outside the top 10, in 1978 and 1987. Since 1999, the year in which the rule was abandoned that songs must be performed in one of the official languages of the country participating, the UK has had less success, having yet to finish within the top ten. For the 2000 contest, the United Kingdom finished in sixteenth place out of twenty-four competing entries with the song "Don't Play That Song Again" performed by Nicki French.

The British national broadcaster, BBC, broadcasts the event within the United Kingdom and organises the selection process for the nation's entry. BBC has traditionally organised a national final featuring a competition among several artists and songs to choose the British entry for Eurovision. For their 2001 entry, the broadcaster announced that a national final involving a public vote would be held to select United Kingdom's entry.

Before Eurovision

A Song for Europe 2001 

A Song for Europe 2001 was the national final developed by the BBC in order to select the British entry for the Eurovision Song Contest 2001. Eight acts competed in the competition which consisted of a semi-final between 22 and 26 January 2001, and a televised final on 11 March 2001. The semi-final was broadcast on BBC Radio 2, while the final was broadcast on BBC One.

Competing entries 
BBC and the British Academy of Songwriters, Composers and Authors (BASCA) announced an open submission for interested artists to submit their songs. A fee was also imposed on songs being submitted to the national final, with £47 for BASCA members and £70.5 for non-BASCA members. Artists aged 17 or under received a discount of £11.75. The submission period lasted until 20 October 2000. The received submissions were reviewed by a professional panel consisting of representatives of the BBC, the BASCA and the Music Publishers Association (MPA) that ultimately selected eight semi-finalists to compete in the national final.

Semi-final
The eight competing acts were premiered during The Ken Bruce Show and Wake Up to Wogan on BBC Radio 2 on 22 January 2001, and the public was able to vote for their favourite song through televoting and online voting until 26 January 2001. The top four songs proceeded to the final. Although the voting results are unknown, it is rumoured that Tony Moore won the semi-final.

Final
Four acts competed in the televised final on 11 March 2001 held at the BBC Elstree Studios in Borehamwood, Hertfordshire and hosted by Katy Hill. A public televote selected the winner, "No Dream Impossible" performed by Lindsay D. The public vote in the final registered 102,352 votes.

At Eurovision
As a member of the "Big Four", the United Kingdom automatically qualified to compete in the Eurovision Song Contest 2002 on 12 May 2001. During the running order draw on 21 November 2000, the United Kingdom was placed to perform in position 16, following the entry from Turkey and before the entry from Slovenia. The United Kingdom placed fifteenth in the final, scoring 28 points.

In the United Kingdom, the show was televised on BBC One with commentary by Terry Wogan and broadcast on BBC Radio 2 with commentary by Ken Bruce. The British spokesperson, who announced the British votes during the final, was Colin Berry.

Voting 
Below is a breakdown of points awarded to the United Kingdom and awarded by the United Kingdom in the contest. The nation awarded its 12 points to Estonia in the contest.

References

2001
Countries in the Eurovision Song Contest 2001
Eurovision
Eurovision